Linda Deutsch (born 1943) is an American journalist who worked for the Associated Press (AP). She covered court cases for 50 years, from 1967 until her retirement in 2014, including the high-profile trials of Charles Manson, Robert F. Kennedy’s assassin, as well as those of O. J. Simpson and Michael Jackson.

Early life and education
Deutsch was born in 1943 in New Jersey. She graduated from Monmouth University, where she earned a bachelor’s degree in English in 1965. She was encouraged to become a journalist by her uncle, a newspaper editor, despite journalism’s severe lack of gender diversity at the time.

Career

When Deutsch first joined the Associated Press, she was the only woman in the Los Angeles bureau. Over the course of her career, she rose through the ranks and earned the title of special correspondent in 1992, a designation bestowed on only 18 reporters since the AP was founded in 1846.

When Deutsch was 20, she covered the 1963 civil rights march on Washington and heard Martin Luther King give his “I Have a Dream” speech.  Her report on that was her first front-page byline. She went on to cover the trials of abolitionist Angela Davis, music mogul Phil Spector, Patty Hearst, pop icon Michael Jackson, late cult leader Charles Manson, actor Robert Blake, serial killer Richard Ramirez, and brothers Lyle and Erik Menendez who were tried and convicted of killing their parents. She also covered the OJ Simpson trial in 1995 for the Associated Press.

Deutsch retired in 2014 but returned temporarily in 2019 to follow up with Simpson about his life after prison, a sentence he served for a 2008 conviction for robbery in Nevada. That year, she also endowed journalism scholarships at her alma mater Monmouth University for $1 million.

Deutsch is working on a memoir.

In 1997, Deutsch promoted the late Theo Wilson’s "Headline Justice: Inside the Courtroom -- The Country's Most Controversial Trials" on a book tour and at her own expense.

Honors and awards

 Lifetime Achievement Award from the Washington Press Club Foundation, which she received at the Congressional Dinner on February 25, 2016
 University of Missouri’s Honor Medal for Distinguished Service in Journalism, 1992
 Society of Professional Journalists “Fellow of the Society,” the organization's highest honor awarded for contributions to the journalism profession, 2005

References

External links
Linda Deutsch's personal website
Interview with Linda Deutsch by Herstory
Profile of Deutsch by the International Women's Media Foundation

1943 births
Living people
People from New Jersey
21st-century American journalists
American women journalists
21st-century American writers
21st-century American women writers
Monmouth University alumni
Associated Press reporters